This is a list of radio stations in the state of Sonora, in Amplitude Modulated and Frequency Modulated bands.

Actives

Historical

Closing stations

Defunct formats

Frequency changes

References

Sonora